Kholodny Klyuch is a rural locality (a village) in Shabagishsky Selsoviet, Kuyurgazinsky District, Bashkortostan, Russia. The population was 317 as of 2010. There are 6 streets.

Geography 
Kholodny Klyuch is located 16 km northwest of Yermolayevo (the district's administrative centre) by road. Mutal is the nearest rural locality.

References 

Rural localities in Kuyurgazinsky District